José Alberto Cabrera (born March 24, 1972) is a Dominican former professional baseball pitcher. He played in Major League Baseball (MLB) for the Houston Astros, Atlanta Braves, and Milwaukee Brewers. Cabrera also played for the SK Wyverns and Lotte Giants of the KBO League.

Born in Santiago de los Caballeros, Dominican Republic's second-largest city, Cabrera entered the majors in 1997 with the Houston Astros, playing four years for them before joining the Atlanta Braves (2001) and Milwaukee Brewers (2002). His most productive season came in 2001 with the Braves, when he posted career-highs with seven wins (7) and a 2.88 ERA in 55 appearances coming out of the bullpen. Before the 2002 season, he was sent by Atlanta, along with Paul Bako, to Milwaukee in the same transaction that brought Henry Blanco to the Braves. He went 6–10 in 50 games, including 11 starts, and set career-numbers in strikeouts (61) and innings pitched.

In 198 games, Cabrera had a 19–17 record with a 4.95 ERA, four saves, and a 2.04 strikeout-to-walk ratio (192-to-94) in 271.0 innings.

Following his major league career, Cabrera pitched for the Scranton/Wilkes-Barre of the International League during the 2003 season.  In 2008, he signed with the Lancaster Barnstormers of the Atlantic League of Professional Baseball.

See also
List of players from Dominican Republic in Major League Baseball

Sources

Retrosheet

1972 births
Acereros de Monclova players
Águilas Cibaeñas players
Atlanta Braves players
Bakersfield Blaze players
Buffalo Bisons (minor league) players
Burlington Indians players (1986–2006)
Canton-Akron Indians players
Columbus RedStixx players
Dominican Republic expatriate baseball players in Mexico
Dominican Republic expatriate baseball players in South Korea
Dominican Republic expatriate baseball players in the United States
Kinston Indians players
Houston Astros players
Lancaster Barnstormers players

Living people
Lotte Giants players
Major League Baseball pitchers
Major League Baseball players from the Dominican Republic
Mexican League baseball pitchers
Milwaukee Brewers players
New Orleans Zephyrs players
Olmecas de Tabasco players
People from Santiago de los Caballeros
Rieleros de Aguascalientes players
Scranton/Wilkes-Barre Red Barons players
SSG Landers players
Central American and Caribbean Games gold medalists for the Dominican Republic
Competitors at the 2010 Central American and Caribbean Games
Central American and Caribbean Games medalists in baseball